David Austin Sayre (March 12, 1793 - September, 1870) was a prominent silversmith, banker and educator. Sayre is best remembered as founder of Sayre Female Institute.

Early life and education
David Austin Sayre was born in Madison, New Jersey on March 12, 1793. Sayre spent his childhood in Madison where he apprenticed to a silversmith. Sayre move to Lexington, Kentucky in 1811 to finish his training.

Career

Banking
In 1820 Sayre started a banking firm D. A. Sayre and Company because of the large amount of surplus silver deposited in his silversmith safe.

Educator
Sayre founded Transylvania Female Seminary in 1854 in a building on Mill Street. The school was renamed Sayre Female Institute in 1855 and moved to Limestone Street.

Later life and death
Sayre is buried in Lexington Cemetery with his wife Abby Vanholt Sayre.

References

1793 births
1870 deaths
American silversmiths
American bankers
Businesspeople from Lexington, Kentucky
People from Madison, New Jersey
Educators from New Jersey
19th-century American businesspeople
19th-century American educators